Flora Speer is an author of stories range from historical romances, to time-travel, to futuristic tales.

Biography
Flora Speer was born in southern New Jersey, and lives in Connecticut.

Bibliography 
 By Honor Bound (1988)
 Venus Rising (1989)
 Much Ado About Love (1989)
 Castle of Dreams (1990)
 Destiny's Lovers (1990)
 Castle of the Heart (1990) 
 Time and Time Again (1991)
 Viking Passion (1992)
 A Time to Love Again (1993) 
 No Other Love (1993)
 A Love Beyond Time (1994)
 Christmas Carol (1994)
 Love Just in Time (1995)
 For Love and Honor (1995) 
 Lady Lure (1996) 
 Rose Red (1996) 
 Heart's Magic (1997)
 The Magician's Lover (1998)
 Love Once and Forever (1999)
 Timestruck (2000)
 A Passionate Magic (2001)
 A Time-Travel Christmas (compilation)

References

External links 
 

American romantic fiction writers
Year of birth missing (living people)
Living people
20th-century American writers
20th-century American women writers
21st-century American writers
21st-century American women writers